The year 2023 is the 20th year in the history of the Wu Lin Feng, a Chinese kickboxing promotion. The events are broadcast on Henan Television in mainland China and streamed on Douyin and Xigua Video.

List of events

Wu Lin Feng 533: China vs. Thailand

Wu Lin Feng 533: China vs. Thailand was a kickboxing event held on February 3, 2023, in Tangshan, China.

Background
The event featured a "China vs. Thailand" theme, with five Chinese fighters facing five Thai fighters.

Results

Wu Lin Feng 2023: Chinese New Year

Wu Lin Feng 2023: Chinese New Year or Wu Lin Feng 534 was a kickboxing event held on February 4, 2023, in Tangshan, China.

Background
A featherweight bout between former K-1 Lightweight Champion Wei Rui and current DFS Lightweight Champion Adrian Maxim is expected to headline the event.

A -67 kilogram Wu Lin Feng World Tournament took place at the event, featuring five domestic and three foreign competitors.

Results

Wu Lin Feng 535: China vs Netherlands

Wu Lin Feng 535: China vs Netherlands was a kickboxing event held on March 18, 2023, in Tangshan, China.

Background
A "China vs. Netherlands" themed series of fights were held at the event, which saw a number of Chinese Wu Lin Feng contracted fighters face fighters from Netherlands.

Results

Wu Lin Feng 536: China vs Japan

Wu Lin Feng 536: China vs Japan was a kickboxing event held on April 22, 2023, in Tangshan, China.

Background

Results

See also
 2023 in Glory 
 2023 in K-1
 2023 in ONE Championship
 2023 in Romanian kickboxing

References

2023 in kickboxing
Kickboxing in China